Bobby Moynihan (born January 31, 1977) is an American actor, comedian, writer, producer, and singer. Moynihan was a cast member and writer for the NBC sketch comedy series Saturday Night Live from 2008 to 2017. Outside of SNL, he has also voiced Louie Duck on Disney's DuckTales from 2017 to 2021, Panda in We Bare Bears from 2015 to 2020, and Hal the Dog in the PBS Kids series Nature Cat since 2015. He has also starred in animated films such as Monsters University (2013) and The Secret Life of Pets (2016) and its 2019 sequel. He portrayed Jayden Kwapis on the sitcom Mr. Mayor and the manatee Loafy in the 2020 show of the same name of which he is also the creator, executive producer, director and writer.

Career
Moynihan frequently performed with the Derrick Comedy sketch group and appeared in many of their popular internet videos and various projects. He also filmed a supporting role in the group's feature film Mystery Team, which premiered at the Sundance Film Festival in 2009 before a limited theatrical release.

In mid-2008, Moynihan had a supporting role in the popular web-series The Line, an online video project funded by Lorne Michaels' production company, directed by SNL head writer and cast member Seth Meyers, and starring SNL cast members Bill Hader and Jason Sudeikis. He acted as a sketch regular on Late Night with Conan O'Brien for a number of years and was a contributing writer on MTV's Human Giant, and in years past, he often submitted scripts to SNL with comedy partner Charlie Sanders. Moynihan has also acted in a number of comedy shorts for the website CollegeHumor, including their webseries Every Week on Entourage where he plays "Turtle" from Entourage. During the summer of 2008, Moynihan featured in a national television ad campaign for ESPN Radio with Yankees broadcaster Michael Kay. In the summer of 2009, Moynihan starred in the music video for Colbie Caillat's single, "Fallin' for You". He also appeared in three of The Lonely Island's music videos; "Boombox", "Shy Ronnie 2" and "Threw It On The Ground". He made a guest appearance as the drug-addicted Conrad Bellingham on Mercy. He also appeared in the films The Invention of Lying, When in Rome, and Certainty. In 2013, he made his voice acting film debut in Monsters University as Chet Alexander, a member of the Roar Omega Roar fraternity. Moynihan also voiced the titular character in the FX animated comedy Chozen, which aired for one season in 2014.

In 2015, he was a featured character, Lenny, in the romantic comedy film Slow Learners (original title Bad Boys, Crazy Girls). He also voiced Panda in the Cartoon Network series We Bare Bears, as well as Hal the Dog in the PBS Kids animated series Nature Cat, he was replaced by Johnny Yong Bosch from rest of the series. In 2016, Moynihan appeared in a commercial for Pizza Hut's Bacon Stuffed crust pizza, and voiced Mel from The Secret Life of Pets in the same year. From 2017 to 2021, he voiced the character Louie Duck in the Disney Channel/Disney XD revival of DuckTales.

Moynihan currently plays interim Director of Communications Jayden Kwapis in the NBC sitcom Mr. Mayor, and stars as the titular manatee Loafy in the Comedy Central animated series that Moynihan created himself. Most recently, Moynihan is releasing a children's book titled "Not All Sheep Are Boring" (https://ew.com/books/author-interviews/bobby-moynihan-not-all-sheep-are-boring-interview/)

Saturday Night Live
Moynihan joined the cast of NBC's Saturday Night Live during its 34th season on September 13, 2008, and stayed to the end of season 42 on May 20, 2017.

Recurring characters on SNL

 Mark Payne, a waiter who works at Pizzeria Uno. He wears a black do-rag and a black and blue button-down T-shirt featuring Sagara Sanosuke from the anime Rurouni Kenshin and always complains about inconsequential things around the pizzeria (the smell of pepper on the first sketch on the episode hosted by Michael Phelps; how sticky the bar counter is in the second sketch on the episode hosted by Tim McGraw). In the first sketch, Mark had a child that he left on a bus and did not realize it until the end of the sketch. The child was never mentioned in the second sketch.
 Anthony Crispino, relays the second-hand news report on Weekend Update, where he always inaccurately reports on current events.
 Vinny Vedecci Jr, the son of Bill Hader's Italian talk show host, Vinny Vedecci. Wears a black and white child's sailor suit. Always wants to ask celebrities ridiculous questions, but the celebrities cannot understand his broken English, which makes him cry (until Vinny gives his son a cigarette and a drink of wine). Vinny Jr. is based on Johnny Caspar, Jr. (played by Louis Charles Mounicou III) in the Coen brothers' Miller's Crossing.
 Liam, one of the kids in Gilly's (played by Kristen Wiig) elementary school class. It is often implied that he hates his stepfather.
 Obnoxious Microphone Guy, a very annoying man who attends parties and other events, will at some point steal the microphone from the emcee (usually played by Jason Sudeikis) and obnoxiously scream "WHAAAAAAAAAT!" into the microphone before dropping it on the floor.
 Scared Straight Kid, one of the three young trouble-makers (along with Bill Hader and Andy Samberg) lectured by convict Lorenzo McIntosh (played by Kenan Thompson) and McIntosh's fellow inmates including hosts Taylor Swift, Lindsay Lohan, and Betty White. McIntosh usually throws his shoe out of anger, and in later sketches he gives it to him to throw.
 Ass Dan, a member of the Kick Spit Underground Rock Festival and winner of the Worst He-Man Impression Contest and the Mud-Eating Contest. Even though the Blake Lively/Rihanna episode established that he died in 2009 at the age of 28 (Ass Dan was born in 1981), he was brought back as one half of the Thrilla Killa Klownz on the episode hosted by Ryan Phillippe in the music video "Magical Mysteries" (in which it was stated that Ass Dan "did just die" in the 2010 sketch, making Ass Dan 29 at the time), brought back again for the 2010 Crunkmas Carnival sketch (in which Li'l Blaster established that Ass Dan was dead and finally getting the wake he deserves), and brought back again for the 2011 Easter Festival (in which D.J. Supersoak established that Ass Dan was getting a proper burial), making Ass Dan 30 years old at the time of this death. The 2011 Columbus Day Assblast on the episode hosted by Ben Stiller implied that Ass Dan was still alive, though he almost had a heart attack and still died before he could say that he was going to live forever after the heart attack allegedly passed. On the Bruno Mars episode in October 2012, it's revealed that Ass Dan has an identical twin brother named Butt Dave (also played by Bobby Moynihan).
 Keith, a young movie fan who is excited about everything except for the illustrious actor/host that week, notably snubbing Robert De Niro in favor of Ben Stiller on the set of Little Fockers. In Keith's first appearance, he snubbed a hockey player (played by host Bradley Cooper).
 Doug, the mechanic for the Merryville Brothers trolley ride. His character was not named on the first sketch with Jim Carrey as the third Merryville brother.
 Richie, the stage manager from The Best of Both Worlds who has, on two occasions, been murdered by Julie Andrews and Ice Cube (played by Helen Mirren and Kenan Thompson respectively) and by Daniel Radcliffe and Clint Eastwood (also played respectively by Hugh Jackman and Bill Hader).
 Slappy Pappy, one of the regular comedians in the "Original Kings of Catchphrase Comedy" video series.
 Drunk Uncle, an extremely inebriated and bitter character who drunkenly rants and raves during Weekend Update.
 Janet Peckinpaugh, a middle-aged woman who hooks up with male celebrities, she hooked up with Tom Brady (as played by Channing Tatum) and Adam Levine as himself.
 Niff, a retail worker who, along with Dana (Cecily Strong) always insults retail workers whenever they fear they're going to get fired.
 Kirby, an astronaut obsessed with his "little kitty cat".
 Riblet, Michael Che's high school friend on Weekend Update.

Celebrity impressions
Bill Belichick
Ken Bone
Susan Boyle
Chris Christie
Mindy Cohn
David Crosby
Ted Cruz
John Daly (golfer) 
Danny DeVito
Josh Duggar
Guy Fieri
Jared Fogle
Rob Ford
Barney Frank
James Gandolfini (as Tony Soprano)
Newt Gingrich
Jonah Hill
Mike Huckabee
Kim Jong-un
Rob Kardashian
Brian Kilmeade
Nathan Lane
George Lucas
George R.R. Martin
Rosie O'Donnell
Psy
Seth Rogen
Kevin Smith
Snooki
Steven Seagal
Donald Sterling
Glenn Thrush
Andrea Bocelli

Personal life
Moynihan is a native of Eastchester, New York. In August 2016, Moynihan married his longtime girlfriend, Broadway actress Brynn O'Malley. Their daughter was born in July 2017.

Moynihan is an avid reader of comic books.

Filmography

Film

Television

Music videos

References

External links

Review of Moynihan's performance with trio Buffoons, from JesterJournal.com, April 13, 2007

1977 births
21st-century American comedians
21st-century American male actors
21st-century American male writers
21st-century American screenwriters
Living people
American impressionists (entertainers)
American male comedians
American male film actors
American male television actors
American television writers
American male television writers
American male voice actors
American sketch comedians
Comedians from New York (state)
Screenwriters from New York (state)
University of Connecticut alumni
Upright Citizens Brigade Theater performers